Nebria baenningeri is a species of ground beetle in the Nebriinae subfamily that is endemic to Altai, Russia.

References

Beetles described in 2001
Endemic fauna of Altai
baenningeri